Tsai Huei-min is a Taiwanese politician. She was the deputy minister of the Atomic Energy Council of the Executive Yuan.

Education
Tsai obtained her bachelor's degree in biology from National Taiwan Normal University, master's degree in natural resource management from Ohio State University in the United States and doctoral degree in geography from National Taiwan University.

References

Living people
Government ministers of Taiwan
Year of birth missing (living people)
National Taiwan Normal University alumni
Ohio State University alumni
National Taiwan University alumni